Jukka Hiltunen is a Finnish actor.

Filmography
The Beach (2000) - Karl
Blow Dry (2001)
28 Days Later (2002)
Terrible Boy (2003)
Nyheter i skärgården (2006)

References

External links

Living people
1965 births
Finnish male actors
Place of birth missing (living people)